Scopula accentuata is a moth of the family Geometridae. It is found in the Democratic Republic of Congo, Kenya and South Africa.

References

Moths described in 1858
accentuata
Moths of Africa
Taxa named by Achille Guenée